SS Caesar Rodney was a Liberty ship built in the United States during World War II. She was named after Founding Father Caesar Rodney, an American lawyer and politician from St. Jones Neck in Dover Hundred, Kent County, Delaware, east of Dover. He was an officer of the Delaware militia during the French and Indian War and the American Revolution, a Continental Congressman from Delaware, a signer of the United States Declaration of Independence, and President of Delaware during most of the American Revolution.

Construction
Caesar Rodney was laid down on 9 August 1942, under a Maritime Commission (MARCOM) contract, MCE hull 916, by the Bethlehem-Fairfield Shipyard, Baltimore, Maryland; she was sponsored by Mrs. Frank W. Burgess, the wife of a yard employee, and was launched on 21 September 1942.

History
She was allocated to International Freighting Corporation, on 30 September 1942. On 15 December 1948, she was laid up in the James River Reserve Fleet, Lee Hall, Virginia. On 24 November 1959, she was sold for scrapping to Walsh Construction Co., for $73,825. She was removed from the fleet on 29 January 1960.

References

Bibliography

 
 
 
 

 

Liberty ships
Ships built in Baltimore
1942 ships
James River Reserve Fleet
Ships named for Founding Fathers of the United States